Matthijs Hendrikszoon Quast (died 6 October 1641), anglicized as Matthys and Matthew Quast, was a Dutch merchant and explorer in the service of the Dutch East India Company (VOC). Quast made several voyages on the VOC's behalf to Tokugawa Japan, the Qing Empire (China), and Ayutthaya Kingdom ("Siam") but is primarily remembered for his failed 1639 expedition in search of the phantom islands of Rica de Oro and Rica de Plata previously reported by Spanish mariners. He is sometimes credited with the first recorded discovery of the Bonin Islands during the voyage, although the VOC did nothing with the information and they remained unimportant and sparsely settled until the 19th century.

1639 Expedition

Claims that southern or eastern seas held islands rich with gold and silver are at least as old as the ancient Greeks, who called them Chryse and Argyre. Quast's expedition was occasioned by a 7 December 1635 report from Willem Verstegen, a VOC trader at Dejima off Nagasaki, that seemed to verify the Spanish claims, placing Kinshima  "Island of Gold") and Ginshima  "Island of Silver") somewhere vaguely east of Honshu. (For his part, Verstegen specifically located the islands to be discovered at 37° 30′ N. somewhere within 400 mijls of the Japanese coast.) The VOC officials at the eastern headquarters of Batavia on Java in the Dutch East Indies (now Jakarta, Indonesia) were unimpressed and uninterested but were eventually overruled by the heeren back in the Netherlands, who ordered them to investigate.

Quast was instructed to go to the area matching the Spanish and Japanese accounts by way of the Philippines and then to continue northwest from there to explore Korea and the possibilities for a Northeast Passage around Mongolia, Manchuria, and Siberia ("Tartary"). Quast and his commander Lucas Albertsen used the Engel as the flagship while his lieutenant Abel Tasmannow famous for his later voyages to Australiacaptained the Gracht.

The expedition left Batavia on 2 June 1639. It passed Luzon into the open water of the Pacific on 10 July. Eager to find the two islands, Quast raised the bonus for the first person to sight land. Simultaneously, he more seriously penalized anyone found asleep on watch: fifty lashes and a fine of a month's pay on the first offense, twice as much for the second, and death for the third. Systematically crossing the sea in the areas indicated, reaching as far as 42° N. and 177° E., the two ships discovered or rediscovered the entirely uninhabited Bonin Islands but found nothing even vaguely resembling what they were looking for. The crew decimated by illness exacerbated by poor rations and the ships beginning to fail, Quast finally abandoned his fruitless search on 25 October. Bad as things were, he directed his men to sail for Fort Zeelandia on Taiwan (now within Tainan's Anping District) rather than attempting to continue northwest. By the time his men reached Tayouan and its fort on 24 November, 41 of the 90 men who had sailed with Quast had died.

Legacy

Uninhabited, remote, and without known resources or harbors, the Bonins were entirely ignored by the Dutch East India Company as they had been ignored by any Spanish before them, permitting their rediscovery and colonization by the Japanese in the next century. Quast's expedition added some detail to Dutch charts of the southern coast of Japan but nothing vital or profitable; it long lingered in complete obscurity until Philipp Franz von Siebold rediscovered its logs after noticing charts of Dutch islands in the area of the rediscovered Bonins. The final leg of his mission which he had been unable to complete was given to Martin de Vries, whose expedition explored Hokkaido, Sakhalin, and the southern Kurils in 1643.

Notes

References

Citations

Bibliography
 .
 , sections reprinted directly with permission.
 .
 .
 
 .
 .
 .

External links
 Holland4

17th-century Dutch explorers
1641 deaths
Dutch East India Company people
Explorers of Asia
Year of birth unknown
Bonin Islands